Milena Rázgová (born 2 November 1969) is a Slovak basketball player. She competed in the women's tournament at the 1992 Summer Olympics.

References

1969 births
Living people
Slovak women's basketball players
Olympic basketball players of Czechoslovakia
Basketball players at the 1992 Summer Olympics
Sportspeople from Ružomberok